Devlin is a given name.

People with name include:

Devlin Barnes (born 1982), South Korean-born American soccer defender
Devlin DeFrancesco (born 2000), Canadian-Italian auto racing driver
Devlin Hodges (born 1996), American football quarterback
Devlin Hope (born 1990), South African rugby union player
Devlin MacKay (born 1997), Scottish football goalkeeper
Devlin Robinson (fl. 2010s–2020s), Pennsylvania State Senate member

See also
Devlin (disambiguation)
Devlin (surname)